Established in 1987, the International Ground Source Heat Pump Association (IGSHPA) is a nonprofit, membership-based organization that promotes geothermal heat pump technology. It was a outreach unit of the College of Engineering, Architecture and Technology (CEAT) at Oklahoma State University until 2020. In June 2020, the OSU Board of Regents voted to approve a transfer of IGSHPA, its intellectual property, and assets to the control of the Geothermal Exchange Organization (GEO).

Primary Efforts

IGSHPA is the main organization for establishing standards of practice and standards of design for Geothermal Heat Pump (GHP) systems in the US. Related organizations have been formed in other countries  on four continents, including Australia, Canada, China, India, South Korea, and Sweden.

Conferences

Each year the association hosts an annual conference for people such as manufacturers, contractors, distributors, and drillers.

Standards
IGSHPA sets and revises standards for Geothermal Heat Pump (GHP) system installs based on ongoing research and field application results.

See also
Association of Energy Engineers
Geothermal heat pump (GHP)
Thermal battery
Renewable thermal energy

External links
 International Ground Source Heat Pump Association

References

Heat pumps
Heating, ventilation, and air conditioning
Engineering organizations
Trade associations based in the United States
Energy business associations